Gastrolobium leakeanum, commonly known as the mountain pea, is a plant in the pea family Fabaceae that is endemic to a small area in the south-west of Western Australia.

Description
Gastrolobium leakeanum was described by James Drummond as being "twelve to fifteen feet (3.7–4.6m) high with opposite leaves three inches long (76mm) by two broad (51mm) and bears clusters of large deep scarlet flowers in the axils of the leaves".

Taxonomy and naming
Gastrolobium leakeanum is one of about 100 species of Gastrolobium. It was first described by James Drummond in the Perth newspaper, The Inquirer on 6 December 1848. Drummond was a prolific contributor to Perth newspapers. The species was subsequently described in William Hooker's Journal of Botany and Kew Garden Miscellany. 
The specific epithet (leakeanum) refers to Mr George Leake, a leading member of Perth society and husband of the botanical illustrator, Georgiana Leake.

Distribution and habitat
Mountain pea grows on mountaintops, ridges and steep slopes in sandy clay or loam over quartzite or in stony soils. It is found in the  Esperance Plains and Mallee biogeographic regions of Western Australia.

Conservation status
This species is classified as "Priority Two" by the Western Australian Government Department of Parks and Wildlife meaning that it is poorly known and from only one or a few locations. It has been shown in glasshouse experiments to be susceptible to the fungus Phytophthora cinnamomi.

Use in horticulture
As with other members of its genus, G. leakeanum has been avoided in cultivation, probably because of the poisonous components in its foliage.

References

Endemic flora of Western Australia
Rosids of Western Australia
Fabales of Australia
leakeanum
Plants described in 1848
Taxa named by James Drummond (botanist)